Kyun also known as A Mhaung Tway Ywar Cha Tae Moe Tain is a 2017 Burmese drama film, directed by Nyunt Myanmar Nyi Nyi Aung starring Nay Toe, Wutt Hmone Shwe Yi and Myint Myat, Ye Aung and Soe Myat Thuzar. It is about the Pagoda slave who was the great slave in Burmese history of Pagan. The film, produced by Aung Tine Kyaw Film Production premiered in Myanmar on May 26, 2017.

Cast
Nay Toe as Kaung Htet Si Thar
Myint Myat as Htike Tan Aung
Wutt Hmone Shwe Yi as Khin Min Kha
Soe Myat Thuzar as Daw Htake Tin Ma Latt
Zaw Oo as U Sein Hla Maung
Thi Yati as Khin Wai
Hein Min as U Phoe Mya
Htoo Mon as Daw Hmwe
Ye Aung as Father of Kaung Htet Si Thar

Award

References

2017 films
2010s Burmese-language films
Burmese drama films
Films shot in Myanmar
2017 drama films